Partido Panaghiusa, commonly known as Panaghiusa, is a local political party based in Cebu City, Philippines and was founded by then radio personality and politician Nenita Cortes-Daluz and was revived in March 2021 by her son, former Cebu City Councilor Jose Daluz III, who is currently serving as its party leader. It is allied with Partido Barug of incumbent mayor Michael Rama and Kugi Uswag Sugbo since 2021.

On December 7, 2021, Daluz confirmed the selection of former Cebu City administrator Floro Casas Jr. as the party's new chairperson just before the death of former Cebu City mayor Edgardo Labella in November 2021. Daluz also announced the party's endorsement for the 2022 elections of incumbent Manila mayor Isko Moreno and incumbent Davao City mayor Sara Duterte for president and vice president, respectively.

Electoral performance

Mayor

Vice Mayor

See also 
 Partido Barug
 Kugi Uswag Sugbo
 Bando Osmeña – Pundok Kauswagan

References 

Local political parties in the Philippines
Politics of Cebu City
Regionalist parties
Regionalist parties in the Philippines